Aisymi (Greek: Αισύμη, Bulgarian: Дуган Хисар, Dugan hisar) is a village in the southern part of the Evros regional unit, Greece. It is located next to the Greek National Road 53, about 20 km north of the city of Alexandroupoli. In 2011 its population was 193 for the village and 253 for the community, including the village Leptokarya.

Population

History

Aisymi dates back to the ancient times as an ancient settlement. Like the rest of Western Thrace, it was ruled by the Ottoman Empire since the 14th century. It remained under Ottoman rule until the Balkan Wars of 1913. At that time, Aisymi (then known as Doğanhisar, Dugan Hisar in Bulgarian) was a Bulgarian speaking village like many parts of today's Evros prefecture. The population in 1912 consisted of 400 Bulgarians.

After a brief period of Bulgarian rule between 1913 and 1919, it became part of Greece. As a result its Bulgarian and Turkish population was exchanged with Greek refugees, mainly from today's Turkey.

People born in Aisymi 
Kiro Chelekov, Bulgarian revolutionary
 Petko Kiryakov  (Captain Petko Voyvoda) (1844–1900), Bulgarian hajduk leader and revolutionary who fought in Western Thrace and Rhodope.
Mara Mihailova (1900–1989), Bulgarian folklorist and journalist

Footnotes

External links
Aissymi on GTP Travel Pages

Alexandroupolis
Populated places in Evros (regional unit)